This is a list of set classes by Forte number. For a list of ordered collections, see: list of tone rows and series.

Sets are listed next to their complements. Inversions are marked "B" (sets not marked "A" or "B" are symmetrical). "T" and "E" are conventionally used in sets to notate 10 and 11, respectively, as single characters.

There are two slightly different methods of obtaining a normal form. This results in two different normal form sets for the same Forte number in a few cases. The alternative notation for those chords are listed in the footnotes.

Elliott Carter had earlier (1960–67) produced a numbered listing of pitch class sets, or "chords", as Carter referred to them, for his own use. Donald Martino had produced tables of hexachords, tetrachords, trichords, and pentachords for combinatoriality in his article, "The Source Set and its Aggregate Formations" (1961).

List

See also
Interval vector
List of chords
Z-relation

Notes

References

External links
Solomon, Larry (2005). "The Table of Pitch Class Sets", SolomonsMusic.net.
Tucker, Gary (2001). "Table of pc set classes", A Brief Introduction to Pitch-Class Set Analysis.
Nelson, Paul (2004). "Table of Prime Forms", ComposerTools.com.
"PC Set Calculator", MtA.Ca.
"Chord Analyzer (PC Set Calculator)"

Musical set theory
Pitch class sets